Pleckstrin homology domain containing, family G member 5 (PLEKHG5) is a protein that in humans is encoded by the PLEKHG5 gene. Eight transcript variants encoding different isoforms have been found for this gene.

Function 

This gene encodes a protein which catalyzes the exchange of GDP for GTP within the small GTPase RhoA which in turn modulates the activation of mDia or Rock kinase to influence cell polarization. It is known to interact with the Crumbs polarity complex by binding to either of the multi PDZ domain adapter proteins Patj or Muc-1. When it is active it helps promote tight junction stabilization. siRNA inhibition of PLKHG5 has been shown to inhibit the motility of cells in scratch assays. It has also been shown to activate the nuclear factor kappa B (NFKB1) signaling pathway.

Clinical significance 
Mutations in the PLEKHG5 gene are associated with distal spinal muscular atrophy type 4. This protein has also shown to be highly expressed in several glioma cell lines, and is likely a driver of metastasis.

References 

Human proteins